Daniel Mark Bennett (born 7 January 1978) is a Singaporean professional footballer who most recently played as a defender for Singapore Premier League club Tanjong Pagar United. Mainly a centre-back, Bennett is a versatile player who is a strong reader of the game, allowing him to make crucial interceptions despite not being blessed with great pace; he is also known for his trademark long-range free kicks.

Born in England, his family moved to Singapore when Bennett was a toddler. A youth product and subsequently a first team player of the then Tiong Bahru United FC, he renounced his British nationality for Singaporean citizenship in September 2002, with the intention to represent the Singapore national team in international football, the country he has lived in for most of his life.

With 146 caps for Singapore over a span of two decades, he currently holds the national record for the most international matches played.

Early life
Bennett was born in Great Yarmouth, England. However, his family moved to Singapore shortly after when he was two years old. He was educated in Singapore at Tanglin Trust School and the United World College of South East Asia, where his father Andrew was a teacher and later headmaster until 2004. He graduated with an honours degree in Sports Science from Loughborough University.

Club career

Early career and club debut
Bennett was selected to join the FAS Milo Scheme for talented young footballers at the age of 12. He was drafted as a trainee by National Football League side Tiong Bahru three years later, giving him the opportunity to train with the team before he left Singapore to further his tertiary studies in England. 

He returned to Singapore in 1999 hoping to make a career as a professional footballer. Then Balestier Central coach P. N. Sivaji gave him his first opportunity with the S.League club. Bennett moved to previous club Tanjong Pagar United (formerly Tiong Bahru) in May 2000. Having played as a midfielder for 15 years, his defining career shift to defence came when coach Tohari Paijan played him as a centre-back in the absence of regular stopper Lim Tong Hai in a league match. 

Recognition of his performances came when he was selected in the Singapore selection that faced Manchester United and Liverpool in a couple of high-profile friendly matches, and culminated in a S.League Player of the Year award.

Wrexham
Bradford City manager Jim Jefferies was impressed with Bennett and offered him a trial at the Yorkshire club. On 8 February 2002, Wrexham manager Denis Smith signed him on a short-term contract til the end of the 2001-02 Football League. Although it is not known how much Wrexham had paid to secure the deal, the club's fans paid money to ensure the club could secure Bennett's signature. He made his league debut against Port Vale on 6 March 2002, partnering Trinidad & Tobago international Dennis Lawrence in the heart of defence. He was assessed as "enjoying a remarkable start, looking composed at the back and reading the game superbly" by the fans, who had contributed money to sign the player. Bennett made over 20 appearances for the Welsh side but with the Welsh side 4th from bottom in the league, relegation was confirmed at the end of the season.

Bennett made a brief return to the S.League in 2002, playing 11 games for Singapore Armed Forces during their title-winning season.

He returned to Wrexham in the 2002-03 season. His second spell was more successful, making 21 appearances, including 3 League Cup games as he helped the club win the FAW Premier Cup and clinch promotion to the Second Division. Bennett was offered new terms by Wrexham at the end of the season but chose to reject the contract to return to Singapore to improve his chances of featuring regularly for the national team.

Return to the S.League
Amid interest from Home United, Tampines Rovers and Woodlands Wellington after his Wales stint, Bennett signed for defending champions Singapore Armed Forces in mid-2003.

Woodlands Wellington
He moved to ambitious Woodlands Wellington in 2005, joining his international colleagues Agu Casmir, Itimi Dickson, Goh Tat Chuan and Masrezwan Masturi. Bennett led the team to 3rd place in the 2005 S.League, and 2nd and 3rd placing in the 2005 and 2006 Singapore Cup respectively.

Back to SAFFC
After two seasons with the Rams, Bennett rejoined Singapore Armed Forces for a second time, achieving the S.League and Singapore Cup double in 2007 and 2008.

In the 2007 Singapore Cup final won by Singapore Armed Forces on 25 November, Bennett was involved in a clash with Tampines Rovers' Noh Alam Shah, a fellow Singapore national team player towards the end of the match. Noh Alam Shah kneed Bennett in the head in a tussle for the ball and after being dragged away by his team-mates, returned and kicked Bennett in the head. Bennett was knocked unconscious and had to be taken to hospital while Alam Shah was sent off by referee Abas Daud. The incident resulted in Alam Shah receiving a 12-month global ban which was reduced to 7 months on appeal.

Bennett was handed the club's captaincy in 2012. As captain he won the Singapore Cup in 2012 as well as the league title in 2014.

Geylang International
After playing for the Warriors for nine years and amassing four league titles and winning the Singapore Cup three times, Bennett signed for Geylang International ahead of the 2016 S.League campaign. He was a key cog of the Eagles defence, helping the team to the league's third-best defensive record, with 29 goals conceded in 24 games as Geylang finished fifth in the nine-team competition.

Tampines Rovers
In 2017, Bennett joined the 6th S.League club of his career, signing for Tampines Rovers FC for the 2017 S.League season. He made 31 appearances in all competitions for the Stags last season and was a key member of league's best local defence, earning him a two-year extension with the club despite almost reaching 40 years old.

Tanjong Pagar United
In January 2022, Bennett returned to Tanjong Pagar United for the second time after over 20 years. He will play for the Jaguars for the 2022 season.

International career

After deliberating two years, Bennett applied for Singaporean citizenship and therefore became eligible to become a Singapore national footballer. He made his debut under then head coach Jan B. Poulsen in a friendly match against the Philippines on 11 December 2002. He had a goal disallowed that day, an effort that he still maintains was a legitimate goal. 

He would score his first international goal against Hong Kong on 4 August 2003. His timely citizenship meant that he took part in the 2002 ASEAN Football Championship in co-hosts Singapore. However, the Lions failed their target of reaching the final.

However, Bennett and his country would achieve significant successes in football within the next few years. Under coach Radojko Avramović, Bennett never missed a call-up to Singapore's tournament squad. He scored with a long-range effort in the 3rd minute of the 2004 finals first leg against Indonesia in front of an intimidating 100,000 Senayan crowd. This meant that Singapore went on to became champions of Southeast Asia, their second title after their 1998 triumph. 

Bennett earned his 100th cap against Thailand on 24 August 2011 and was inducted into the FIFA Century Club. With his 122nd appearance in the away leg of the 2012 ASEAN Football Championship finals, Bennett surpassed Aide Iskandar and Malek Awab as Singapore's most capped player. Bennett subsequently completed a hat-trick of titles with tournament wins in 2007 and 2012.

As of January 2017, Bennett amassed 132 caps, tied with Shahril Ishak as Singapore's most-capped player. 

As of 2022, Bennett has 146 caps for Singapore. He currently holds the national record for the most international matches played for his country.

Personal life 
Bennett married Cherry Cheung on 1734 January 2.

Career statistics

Club

( - ) indicates unavailable referenced data conforming to reliable sources guidelines.

International
Scores and results list Singapore's goal tally first, score column indicates score after each Bennett goal.

Honours
Singapore Armed Forces Football Club (Warriors FC)
Singapore Premier League: 2002, 2007, 2008, 2009, 2014
Singapore Cup: 2007, 2008, 2012, 2019

Wrexham
FAW Premier Cup: 2003

Singapore
ASEAN Football Championship: 2004, 2007, 2012

Individual
S.League Player of the Year: 2001

Notes

See also 
 List of men's footballers with 100 or more international caps

References

External links

Daniel Bennett at 7m.cn

Singaporean footballers
Singapore international footballers
FIFA Century Club
Tanjong Pagar United FC players
Woodlands Wellington FC players
Wrexham A.F.C. players
Warriors FC players
Singapore Premier League players
Alumni of Loughborough University
English emigrants to Singapore
People who lost British citizenship
Naturalised citizens of Singapore
Sportspeople from Great Yarmouth
1978 births
Living people
Balestier Khalsa FC players
Association football defenders
English Football League players
Footballers at the 2006 Asian Games
Asian Games competitors for Singapore